The 2011–12 Israeli Noar Premier League was the 18th season since its introduction in 1994 as the top-tier football in Israel for teenagers between the ages 18–20, and the first under the name Noar Premier League.

Maccabi Tel Aviv won the title, whilst Hapoel Ra'anana and Maccabi Herzliya were relegated.

Final table

References

External links
 2011-2012 Noar Leumit League IFA 
Noar Premier League 11-12 One.co.il 

Israeli Noar Premier League seasons
Noar Premier League